Philip of Ibelin (1180-1227) was a leading nobleman of the Kingdom of Cyprus.  As a younger son of Balian of Ibelin and the dowager queen Maria Komnene, he came from the high Crusader nobility of the Kingdom of Jerusalem.

Life
Philip is first mentioned in 1206, when he and his older brother John of Ibelin, the Old Lord of Beirut accompanied their niece Alice  to Cyprus for her marriage to Hugh I of Cyprus. Both brothers moved their power base to the island permanently before 1217, probably after coming into conflict with King John of Jerusalem. In 1218 Hugh I of Cyprus died and Philip was made steward (i.e. regent) to Henry I of Cyprus during his minority - in this position he was instrumental in the house of Ibelin's rising dominance over the island.

Marriage and issue
Philip married Alice of Montbéliard (died after 1244), a sister of Odo of Montbéliard.  They had two children: 
 Maria of Ibelin († after 1244), became a nun, for whom in 1244 Alice funded the establishment of St Theodor monastery in Nicosia.
 John of Ibelin († 1266), Count of Jaffa

Notes

Bibliography
 Steven Runciman: A History of the Crusades. 1951.
 Kenneth M. Setton, Robert Lee Wolff, Harry W. Hazard: A History of the Crusades, Volume II. The Later Crusades, 1189-1311. 2006.

External links
Family of Balian of Ibelin at fmg.ac

References 

House of Ibelin
1180 births
1227 deaths